Lazarus is a free cross-platform visual integrated development environment (IDE) for rapid application development (RAD) using the Free Pascal compiler. Its goal is to provide an easy-to-use development environment for programmers developing with the Object Pascal language, which is as close as possible to Delphi.

Software developers use Lazarus to create native-code console and graphical user interface (GUI) applications for the desktop, and also for mobile devices, web applications, web services, visual components and function libraries for a number of different platforms, including Mac, Linux and Windows.

A project created by using Lazarus on one platform can be compiled on any other one which Free Pascal compiler supports. For desktop applications a single source can target macOS, Linux, and Windows, with little or no modification. An example is the Lazarus IDE itself, created from a single code base and available on all major platforms including the Raspberry Pi.

Features
Lazarus provides a highly visual development environment for the creation of rich user interfaces, application logic, and other supporting code artifacts, similar to Borland Delphi. Along with project management features, the Lazarus IDE also provides:
 A What You See Is What You Get (WYSIWYG) visual windows layout designer
 GUI widgets or visual components such as edit boxes, buttons, dialogs, menus, etc.
 Non-visual components for common behaviors such as persistence of application settings
 Data-connectivity components for MySQL, PostgreSQL, FireBird, Oracle, SQLite, Sybase, and others
 Data-aware widget set that allows the developer to see data in visual components in the designer to assist with development
 Interactive code debugger
 Code completion
 Code templates
 Syntax highlighting
 Context-sensitive help
 Text resource manager for internationalisation (internationalization)
 Automatic code formatting
 The ability to create custom components

Cross-platform development 

Lazarus uses Free Pascal as its back-end compiler. Therefore, Lazarus can theoretically  be used to develop applications for all platforms supported by Free Pascal.

Lazarus provides a cross-platform application framework called the Lazarus Component Library (LCL), which provides a single, unified interface for programmers, with different platform-specific implementations. Using LCL, it is possible to create applications in a write once, compile anywhere manner, unless system-dependent features are used explicitly.

Cross-compiling 
As Free Pascal supports cross-compiling, Lazarus applications can be cross-compiled from Windows to Linux / macOS / etc. and vice versa.

Applications for embedded devices (smartphones, PDAs, routers, game consoles) can be cross-compiled from any desktop platform.

Lazarus Component Library 

The standard application framework, Lazarus Component Library (LCL) was originally modeled after the Visual Component Library (VCL) in Delphi 6, but, unlike Delphi, is not restricted to Microsoft Windows operating systems. This is done by separating the definition of common widget classes and their widgetset-specific implementation. Each widget set is supported by providing an interface which interacts directly with the set.

Database development 
Developers can install packages that allow Lazarus to support several database management systems (DBMSes). Programs can interact with DBMSes through code or by components dropped on a form.

The following DBMSes are supported out of the box:
 dBase and FoxPro, supported through the TDbf component
 InterBase / Firebird. See 
 Microsoft SQL Server and Sybase ASE. See 
 MySQL and MariaDB. See 
 ODBC databases. See 
 Oracle. See 
 PostgreSQL. See 
 SQLite. See 
 Simple, local, flat file databases through TBufDataset, TMemDataset and TSdfDataset.

Differences from Delphi 
While resembling Delphi in many ways, there are a few limitations regarding the performance and feature set, including:
 Under Windows, the default size of an executable file is larger than the Delphi 6 or 7 equivalent, as Lazarus stores debug information within the executable, rather than as separate files.  From 0.9.30 onwards, Lazarus supports external debug symbols; program file size can be significantly reduced (via compiler options) by using an external symbols file.  Alternatively, debug info can be stripped from EXEs (e.g. using a port of the UNIX strip command).
 Components for Delphi can be converted to work in Lazarus. This can be complex, though less so than for Lazarus versions older than 0.9.30, based on FP 2.4.x.
 Lack of Datasnap, which uses Embarcadero proprietary enterprise functionality, not a publicly documented system.
 Networking is mostly available.
 No support to directly call .NET libraries. Object Pascal code can be called from .NET software.
 No support for dynamically loadable packages.
 Not fully compatible with VCL. As mentioned previously, this is by design, although the LCL widget set should suffice for most applications. But this makes the deep repository of available VCL widgets inaccessible without conversion. The conversion effort mostly involves some editing, although there are a few fundamental differences. When porting, missing units in the libraries are a considerably bigger problem than incompatibilities between LCL and VCL.
 Microsoft Office connectivity limited to popping up Microsoft Excel with a simple table filled out (since FPC 2.6.0).
 Microsoft Component Object Model (COM) is supported (since Lazarus 2.2.0).

Distribution and licensing 
Like Free Pascal, Lazarus is free software. Different portions are distributed under different free software licenses, including GPL, LGPL, MPL, and a modified version of LGPL.

Specifically, the LCL, which is statically built into the produced executables, is licensed under a modified version of the LGPL, granting extra permissions to allow it to be statically built into the produced software, including proprietary ones.

Installing a design time package is equivalent to linking to the IDE, so that distributing the Lazarus IDE with a GPL-incompatible design-time package such as the JEDI packages licensed under the Mozilla Public License, pre-installed would cause a license violation. This does not prohibit proprietary packages from being developed with Lazarus.

History 
The first attempt to develop a visual IDE for Free Pascal dates back to 1998, under the name "Megido project". For various reasons this approach failed. Some of Megido's developers then started a new project based on a more flexible foundation.

The first preliminary LCL version was ready for release in 2001, and in 2003 the first beta version of Lazarus (0.9.0.3) was hosted at SourceForge. The first final Lazarus version (1.0) was released in 2012, and significantly enhanced Lazarus 1.2 with was released in 2014. More than four million downloads had been made from SourceForge as of March 2014.

The name "Lazarus" alludes to the revival of the Megido concept. It is inspired by Lazarus of Bethany, who, according to the Gospel of John, was restored to life by Jesus four days after his death.

Versions

Examples of applications produced with Lazarus 
 ASuite is a free open-source application launcher for Windows. From 2.1 Alpha 1, it's fully written in Lazarus/FPC.
 Beyond Compare is a data comparison utility for Windows, macOS, and Linux. The macOS and Linux versions are compiled using Lazarus/FPC.
 Cartes du Ciel is a free planetarium program for Linux, macOS and Windows. The software maps out and labels most of the constellations, planets, and objects you can see with a telescope. It is fully written in Lazarus/FPC and released under GPL.
 C-evo is an open source turn-based strategy game that has been ported from Delphi to Lazarus.
 Cheat Engine is an open-source memory scanner/hex editor/debugger. It is useful for cheating in computer games. Since version 6.0 it is compiled with Lazarus/FPC.
 EPANET, a software package for modelling water-distribution systems.
 HNSKY, Hallo Northern Sky is a free planetarium program for Windows and Linux. Since version 3.4.0 written and compiled with Lazarus/FPC.
 MyNotex is a free software for Linux useful to take and manage textual notes.
 PeaZip is an open-source archiver, made with Lazarus/FPC.
 TorChat is moving away from Python and is being rewritten in Lazarus + Free Pascal.
 Total Commander 64-bit version.
 Double Commander is a cross-platform open-source file manager with two panels side by side. It is inspired by Total Commander, plus some new ideas.
 CudaText is a cross-platform open-source text editor.
 Coedit (renamed to Dexed) is an IDE for the D programming language.
 SimThyr is a continuous simulation program for thyroid homeostasis.
 Tomboy-ng, the currently active manifestation of Tomboy.
 Tranzistow  is a 32/64-bit software synthesizer for Windows and Linux developed with FreePascal/Lazarus.
 Simba  is a automation program that facilitates the automation and repetition of certain programmable complicated tasks.

Examples of Delphi libraries compatible with Lazarus 
 GLScene is a free OpenGL-based library that provides visual components and objects allowing description and rendering of 3D scenes.
 OpenWire is an open-source library that allows pin type properties to make connections between LCL components similar to LabVIEW or Agilent VEE.

See also 

 Comparison of Pascal IDEs
 Dev-Pascal
 Embarcadero Delphi
 Free Pascal Compiler
 Object Pascal

Citations

Additional references

External links 

 Lazarus Homepage
 About Lazarus
 Project Homepage at SourceForge.net
 The Lazarus Documentation Project
 Get Lazarus hosting downloads
 Lazarus learning center

1999 software
Cross-platform free software
Cross-platform software
Free computer libraries
Free integrated development environments
Free Pascal
Free software programmed in Pascal
Integrated development environments
Linux integrated development environments
MacOS programming tools
Pascal (programming language)
Pascal programming language family
Pascal (programming language) software
Platform-sensitive development
Programming tools for Windows
User interface builders